Frederik Nielsen and Tim Pütz were the defending champions but chose not to defend their title.

Alexander Erler and Lucas Miedler won the title after defeating Harri Heliövaara and Jean-Julien Rojer 6–3, 7–6(7–2) in the final.

Seeds

Draw

References

External links
 Main draw

Tali Open - Doubles